Kushchevsky may refer to:

Ivan Kushchevsky, (1847-1876) Russian writer
Kushchevsky District, Krasnodar Krai, Russia

See also
Kushchyovsky (disambiguation)